Luigi Randazzo (born 30 April 1994) is an Italian male volleyball player. He is part of the Italy men's national volleyball team. On club level he plays for El Ahly.

Championship
Luigi Randazzo took part to the FIVB Volleyball Men's World Championship, in which the Italian national team arrived fifth.

References

External links
Profile at FIVB.org

1994 births
Living people
Italian men's volleyball players
Sportspeople from Catania
Blu Volley Verona players
Expatriate volleyball players in Egypt
Italian expatriate sportspeople in Egypt
Al Ahly (men's volleyball) players